Teli can refer to:
 Teli, caste traditionally occupied in the pressing of oil in India, Nepal and Pakistan
 Muslim Teli, ethnic group found in Pakistan and India
 Gangu Teli, historical or apocryphal figure from the era of the Parmara dynasty of central India
 Admir Teli,  Albanian retired professional footballer
 Xu Teli, politician of the People's Republic of China